Olurus or Olouros was a town of ancient Achaea, dependent upon Pellene. It is cited by numerous ancient authors, including Xenophon, Pliny the Elder, Pomponius Mela, and Stephanus of Byzantium.

Its site is unlocated.

References

Populated places in ancient Achaea
Former populated places in Greece
Lost ancient cities and towns